Canadian NORAD Region (CANR) Forward Operating Location (FOL) Yellowknife was upgraded as part of the North American Air Defence Modernization (NAADM) program authorized at the Shamrock Summit held in Quebec City on March 18, 1985.  The NAADM program was authorized by the Canada-United States Memorandum of Understanding signed by Prime Minister Mulroney and Ronald Reagan at the summit.  The purpose of the upgraded facilities at Yellowknife Airport was to accommodate up to six fighters in hangars when needed, 200 support personnel, and storage facilities.   The facility was built and accepted by DND in 1994, without munitions storage facilities.

FOL Yellowknife is located immediately southwest of the Yellowknife Airport (YZF), and uses its runways when required.

References

Royal Canadian Air Force